Christian Coalition may refer to:

Christian Coalition of America
Christian Coalition (New Zealand)
Australian Christian Lobby, previously called the Australian Christian Coalition
Christian's Coalition, a now defunct professional wrestling stable in Total Nonstop Action Wrestling